Electoral district of Windsor may refer to:
 Windsor (UK Parliament constituency), a current constituency of the UK House of Commons
 Electoral district of Windsor (New South Wales), a former electorate of the New South Wales Legislative Assembly
 Electoral district of Windsor (Queensland), a former electorate of the Queensland Legislative Assembly